Ragna Flotve (born 25 September 1960) is a Norwegian politician for the Socialist Left Party.

She served as a deputy representative to the Norwegian Parliament from Hordaland during the term 2001–2005. In total she met during 50 days of parliamentary session.

References

1960 births
Living people
Socialist Left Party (Norway) politicians
Deputy members of the Storting
Hordaland politicians
Place of birth missing (living people)
21st-century Norwegian women politicians